Statehood Day may refer to:

 Statehood Day (Bosnia and Herzegovina)
 Statehood Day (Croatia)
 Statehood Day (Czech Republic), a public holiday in the Czech Republic
 Statehood Day (Hawaii)
 Statehood Day (Lithuania)
 Statehood Day (Montenegro)
 Statehood Day (Serbia)
 Statehood Day (Slovenia)
 Statehood Day (Ukraine)

See also
 List of U.S. states by date of admission to the Union